The Longfin halfbeak (Hemiramphus saltator) is an ocean-going species of fish in the family Hemiramphidae native to the eastern Pacific Ocean.

References

External links
 

Longfin halfbeak
Fish of the Pacific Ocean
Taxa named by Charles Henry Gilbert
Taxa named by Edwin Chapin Starks
Fish described in 1904